Rock'n Wrestle is a professional wrestling video game released in 1985 for the ZX Spectrum, Amstrad and Commodore 64 8-bit home computers, and as Bop'N Wrestle in 1986 for DOS by Mindscape.

Reception
Rick Teverbaugh reviewed the game for Computer Gaming World, and stated that "Bop 'N Wrestle is a game with some stunning graphics. It is also a well-timed release now that championship wrestling is now a network staple. But, unfortunately, it is a game that tries to do too much."

See also
List of licensed professional wrestling video games

References

External links
http://www.lemon64.com/?mainurl=http%3A//www.lemon64.com/games/details.php%3FID%3D2166
http://www.gb64.com/game.php?id=6440
http://www.zzap64.co.uk/cgi-bin/displaypage.pl?issue=012&page=037&thumbstart=0&magazine=zzap&check=1
http://www.the-commodore-zone.com/user/index.php?p=getitem&db_id=1&item_id=784
http://spong.com/game/11021752/Rock-n-Wrestle-C64
Review in Antic
Review in Commodore Microcomputers

1985 video games
Commodore 64 games
ZX Spectrum games
Amstrad CPC games
DOS games
Professional wrestling games
Video games developed in Australia
Mindscape games